Stephen Charles "Flip" Filipowicz (June 28, 1921 – February 21, 1975) was a professional American football and baseball player. Filipowicz and Olympic great Jim Thorpe share the distinction of being the only two men to have played for the New York Giants of both baseball and football.

Football
Filipowicz, a fullback and quarterback who played at Fordham University from 1941 to 1943, was drafted by the New York Giants in the first round in the 1943 NFL Draft. Although an undersized back at 5'8", 198 lbs, he was still taken with the sixth overall pick. In his first season, he rushed for 142 yards on 53 attempts and had 49 receiving yards. He also attempted two incomplete passes. In 1946 he made seven receptions for 84 yards and caught four interceptions as a blocking back. He retired after the season to become head football, basketball, and baseball coach at Mount Saint Mary's University. He resigned the following year to play baseball.

Baseball
After a successful season as an outfielder and catcher for the Jersey City Giants, Filipowicz made his major league debut on September 3, 1944 for the New York Giants. He appeared in 15 games, collecting 8 hits in 41 at bats (.195). He appeared in 35 games the next season and batted .205 with 2 home runs. He made a return to baseball in 1948 with the Sunbury Reds of the Interstate League. He was called up to the Cincinnati Reds later that season and collected 9 hits in 26 at bats (.346). He spent the 1949 & 1950 seasons with the Syracuse Chiefs of the International League and the Tulsa Oilers of the Texas League.

References

External links

 Steve Filipowicz NFL Stats at databaseFootball.com

1921 births
1975 deaths
American men's basketball coaches
Cincinnati Reds players
Syracuse Chiefs players
Fordham Rams football players
Fordham Rams baseball players
Baseball players from Pennsylvania
Basketball coaches from Pennsylvania
Major League Baseball outfielders
Mount St. Mary's Mountaineers baseball coaches
Mount St. Mary's Mountaineers football coaches
Mount St. Mary's Mountaineers men's basketball coaches
New York Giants players
New York Giants (NL) players
Tulsa Oilers (baseball) players
Georgia Pre-Flight Skycrackers football players
People from Donora, Pennsylvania